Niagara Central Dorothy Rungeling Airport or Welland/Niagara Central Dorothy Rungeling Aerodrome, is a registered aerodrome located in Pelham,  west of Welland, Ontario, Canada. Niagara Central accommodates a flight school, skydivers, aerial photographers, itinerant light aircraft and an automatic weather station. It was built in 1940 by the Royal Canadian Air Force as part of the British Commonwealth Air Training Plan and served as the relief airfield for the No. 6 Service Flying Training School in nearby Dunnville.

The airport is the home of the 87th Eagle Squadron of the Royal Canadian Air Cadets who have training and administration space in the airport's former meeting place of Welland Fire Company Number 1. The Southern Ontario Gliding Centre (SOGC) of the Royal Canadian Air Cadets also use the airport for spring and fall familiarization flights for the cadets.

In 1995, various members of Fonthill Branch 613 of the Royal Canadian Legion lobbied to have the airport renamed "Bud Kerr Welland Airport" in recognition of a local World War II Spitfire fighter pilot, but were unsuccessful. In 2015 the airport was renamed Niagara Central Dorothy Rungeling Airport, in honour of the legendary Canadian pilot Dorothy Rungeling, CM.

See also
 St. Catharines/Niagara District Airport
 Niagara Falls/Niagara South Airport

References

External links
 Page about this airport on COPA's Places to Fly airport directory
 Official website, see About Us for history
 Niagara Skydive, major tenant
 St. Catharines Flying Club, major tenant

Registered aerodromes in Ontario
Transport in Welland
Royal Canadian Air Force stations
Military airbases in Ontario
Airports of the British Commonwealth Air Training Plan
Military history of Ontario
1940 establishments in Ontario